Martin Bundi (19 October 1932 – 1 January 2020) was a Swiss historian and politician. He was a member of the Swiss National Council from 1975 to 1995 and was the chamber’s President in 1985 and 1986. He was a native of the Canton of Grisons and a longtime member of the Social Democratic Party.

Prior to his political career, he was a teacher who conducted research of the history of Grisons and the Rhaetian Alps. He was also active in the preservation of the Rhaeto-Romance language.

Biography
Bundi was born in Sagogn in the Canton of Grisons on 19 October 1932. He earned a doctorate at the University of Zürich in 1963 and became a teacher at the Graubünden Teacher Training Collegein Chur. He became the deputy director of the college in 1967.

In 1972, Bundi was elected to the municipal council of Chur where he served until 1975. 

In the 1975 Swiss federal election, Bundi was elected to the National Council. While on the council, he was on the committee for science and research, the military committee and the foreign policy committee. He was a supporter of the 
Romansh language and worked to upgrade its status in the Swiss Federal Constitution.

In 1991, Bundi became the President of the Federal National Park Commission and was the chairman of Renania, a society dedicated to Rhaeto-Romance.

Bundi was married with five children. He died on 1 January 2020 at the age of 87.

References

External links
Profile at Official Federal Assembly website

1932 births
2020 deaths
Members of the National Council (Switzerland)
Presidents of the National Council (Switzerland)
Social Democratic Party of Switzerland politicians
People from Chur